Plasmodium narayani is a parasite of the genus Plasmodium subgenus Vinckeia. As in all Plasmodium species, P. narayani has both vertebrate and insect hosts. The vertebrate hosts for this parasite are mammals.

Taxonomy 
The parasite was first described by de Mello and Diaz in 1936.

This parasite has only been described on one occasion. The description is incomplete and this species should be regarded as being of dubious validity until further work has confirmed or refuted these findings.

Description
As described the schizonts were annular and amoeboid and between 1/5 and 1/6 of the erythrocyte in size. Black pigment was seen. 9-11 merozoites per schizont were seen. The gametocytes were oval. No granules or dots were seen in the erythrocytes.

Distribution 
This parasite is found in India.

Vectors
Not known.

Hosts 
This species infects the otter (Lutea lutra).

References 

narayani